Evelyn Williams may refer to:

 Evelyn Williams (politician), member of the New Jersey General Assembly
 Evelyn Williams (artist) (1929–2012), British figurative artist
 Evelyn Williams, mistress of Elijah Muhammad